Shell grit is coarsely ground or broken seashells. It is used, among other things, by birds as a source of calcium for egg shell production, and to aid digestion.

Other uses include protecting plants from slugs or snails and for aquariums.

References

External links
 http://ozbird.com/roleofgrit.htm A discussion on the role of grit in a bird's diet.
 http://www.birdhealth.com.au/bird/budgie/feeding.html A discussion on feeding Budgies, including the role of grit.

Pedology